Massappeal were an Australian hardcore punk band founded in early 1985 by mainstays, Brett Curotta (guitar), and Randy Reimann (vocals). Massapeal released four studio albums, Nobody Likes a Thinker (1986), Jazz (1989), The Mechanic (1992) and Nommo Anagonno (1994), before disbanding late in 1994.

History 

Massappeal were a pioneering Sydney-based hardcore punk band formed in early 1985 by Brett Curotta on guitar (ex-Bedspreads), Darren Gilmour on drums (ex-Rocks, Climate of Fear), Kevin McCrear on bass guitar, and Randy Reimann on lead vocals. According to Australian musicologist, Ian McFarlane, they "mixed breakneck punk tempos with unrelenting heavy metal guitar riffs to arrive at a potent and rough-hewn sound."

The band learned of hardcore punk from the US and UK via tape trading and by reading zines. The band's first gig was on Mardi-Gras night in 1985 in Sydney. They first made their music available-a live taping-on a compilation tape for a fanzine entitled Zit. Waterfront Records asked the band to record a demo in May 1986 and an album, Nobody Likes a Thinker, which was released in December 1986. It was reviewed positively in Australian music magazines and daily newspapers. The album garnered the number 1 spot on the Australian indie charts. The band toured Australia, first with fellow Sydney band and label mates Hard-Ons, and later with the US band DRI. Darren left the band in 1987 and Tubby(Alex) Wadsworth, a drummer from the metal scene, took over on drums.

After Tubby left the band in 1988, Curotta reached out to Dave Ross (ex-Civil Dissident, Vicious Circle, Nobody's Victim) to fill the drumming seat. Ross re-located his home base from Melbourne to Sydney and soon after Sean Fonti (ex-My Heart Bleeds for You) replaced McCrear on bass guitar. During this transition period, the Massappeal sound developed a slower, more complex intensity that framed the musical stylings of much of their follow up album Jazz (1989). Later that year, Massappeal toured nationally supporting Rollins Band. The band's sound continued to develop, maintaining the intensity of its thrash based roots while exploring more dynamic shifts in sound, incorporating light and space to complement heavy prog-rock moments. Prior to recording The Mechanic (1991) Ross left and was replaced by Peter Allen (ex-Terrible Virtue). Fonti left soon after to form Caligula with his brother Jamie and Ross on drums. Ross would later form Sydney based outfit Bob with McCrear on bass guitar.

Members 

 Brett Curotta (guitar)
 Darren Gilmour (drums)
 Kevin McCrear (bass guitar)
 Randy Reimann (vocals)
 Alex Nikolzew (drums)
 Sean Fonti (bass guitar)
 David Ross (drums)
 Peter Allen (drums)
 Adrielle Spence (bass)
 Ashley Chatto (guitar)
 Andy Coplin (bass guitar)
 James Meek (bass guitar)
 Alex (Tubby) Wadsworth (drums)

References

Australian hardcore punk groups